Papa John may refer to:

 John Phillips (19352001), American musician most famous as a member of The Mamas & the Papas
 John Schnatter (born 1961), American businessman and founder of Papa John's Pizza
 Papa John's Pizza, American restaurant chain

See also 

 Papajohn, a Greek surname